Nerekhta is a rural locality (a settlement) in Novoselskoye Rural Settlement, Kovrovsky District, Vladimir Oblast, Russia. The population was 444 as of 2010. There are 7 streets.

Geography 
Nerekhta is located on the Nerekhta River, 20 km south of Kovrov (the district's administrative centre) by road. Krutovo is the nearest rural locality.

References 

Rural localities in Kovrovsky District